Minno is an online subscription-based  streaming media provider created by Erick Goss and Dan Raines. It specializes in Christian programming for children. Subscribers have access to over 2,300 episodes from 130 shows. Video is made available through applications for smartphones, tablets, and popular streaming devices such as Roku, Amazon Fire TV, Apple TV, Android TV and Chromecast.

History
Minno began when founders Erick Goss and Dan Raines wanted to offer parents a streaming platform that included an ad-free streaming experience featuring shows about the Bible and Christian discipleship. The name Minno is derived from the Greek word “meno” which means "to abide" and is a reference to John 15 in the New Testament of the Bible. Minno is the operating name of Winsome Truth, Inc., which was formed by Goss and Raines in 2018 following the acquisition of the app under its former name, JellyTelly. Goss is a tech and military veteran, and Raines is a Christian media exec. The company is the recipient of TINYPulse’s 2020 Happiest Company Award. Today, Minno is both privately-funded by mission-driven investors and on subscriber revenue. It is a Public-benefit Corporation.

Programming 
Minno licenses and creates original programming that is vetted through a 50+ point checklist focused on child development, theology, and entertainment quality. Shows are developed with and licensed from studios around the world including France, South Africa, New Zealand, Canada and the United States. Minno also currently offers the largest selection of original VeggieTales on a single platform through an agreement with NBCUniversal.

The company’s current slate of original content includes:

 5-Minute Family Devotionals 
 Church at Home
 Hopeful Easter
 Cocoa Talk
 Galaxy Buck Mission To Sector 9: The Series
 Micah’s Super Vlog
 Pops and Peanut 
 The Minno Day Show

Home Video Releases
The characters of Minno have recently starred in a new spinoff series titled "What's In The Bible with Buck Denver?". What's In The Bible was released over 13 DVD Volumes (each with two 25 minute episodes). The series will cover the entire Bible. The first two volumes were released on March 1, 2010. Also, Why Do We Call It Christmas?, Clive and Ian's Wonder-Blimp of Knowledge, Sing Through the Bible! and Galaxy Buck: Mission to Sector 9.

Technical Details
Minno is Subscription Video on Demand platform, powered by industry-leading technologies, such as Amazon Web Services, Stripe, Vimeo

Off-Screen Publishing and Resources 
Off the screen, Minno publishes free and low-cost parenting resources through MinnoLife, produces The Minno Raising Boys & Girls Podcast (2M+ downloads), and published the Minno Laugh & Grow Bible for Kids (2020 Christian Book Award from Evangelical Christian Publisher Association and is the fastest-selling children’s Bible) in partnership with Hachette Book Group.

COVID lockdowns 
During the COVID lockdowns of 2020 and 2021, Minno offered a free weekly “Church at Home” experience on its website for families not attending in-person church.

References

American comedy websites
Internet properties established in 2008
Christian websites
Video on demand services
American flash animated web series
Web series featuring puppetry